Thomas Rooke may refer to:
 Thomas Charles Byde Rooke, English physician who married into the royal family of the Kingdom of Hawaii
 Thomas Matthews Rooke, British watercolourist